The Daniel Bliss Homestead is a historic colonial farmhouse at 76 Homestead Avenue in Rehoboth, Massachusetts.

Description and history 
The -story main block of this wood-framed house was built in about 1750, and is a typical Georgian five-bay wide, center-chimney structure. Two ells were added to the east end in the 19th century. The house has retained many Georgian details because one owner, while renovating the house, removed and carefully stored the elements, which were restored c. 1970 by a later owner.

The house was listed on the National Register of Historic Places in 1983.

See also
National Register of Historic Places listings in Bristol County, Massachusetts

References

Houses completed in 1750
Buildings and structures in Rehoboth, Massachusetts
Houses in Bristol County, Massachusetts
Houses on the National Register of Historic Places in Bristol County, Massachusetts